Fort Boyard: Ultimate Challenge is a children's game show, based on the French show Fort Boyard, which aired on both CITV and Disney XD. The show is a challenge game where six different "fearless" teams of teenagers battle-to-the-finish to win the "Ultimate Challenge" and become the "Ultimate Conquerors Of The Fort".  The first two series were a British-American co-production with Disney XD, airing from 17 October 2011 to 23 March 2012 in the United States. In the United Kingdom, it premiered on New Year's Day 2012, with later series solely produced for the United Kingdom. The series ended on 17 December 2014 after five series.

The show is a revived and updated version of the original format, broadcast in the UK from 1998 to 2003, and was presented by Geno Segers and Laura Hamilton in the first two series. In May 2012, Fort Boyard: Ultimate Challenge was renewed for a third series. It was also revealed that Andy Akinwolere would be the new co-host, replacing Geno Segers. The third series began on 8 December 2012 and was simulcast on the ITV network. The fourth series began airing on 20 October 2013 and the fifth series began airing on 15 October 2014. Hamilton and Akinwolere both returned to present series 4 and 5. The series was also rolled-out globally (excluding France and the Nordic countries) on the Disney network.

Format
Six teams compete against each other in a tournament. In every episode, two teams face each other in a battle to see who is the strongest and toughest team. The challenges are based on toughness, fear and speed. In each season, the teams play three times each; with the two teams which have the most gold coins returning for the final round of the tournament at the series' finale.

In every level, the teams fight to get a key which helps them in the final level of the game in the Treasure Chamber. If they get three (five in series 3, 4 and 5) keys or more at the end of the game, they get the maximum amount of time in the Treasure Chamber (three minutes); but if they get two (four from series 3) keys or less, a time penalty will be dealt out (see below). If a team wins a 4th key (6th or more from series 3), they receive an extra 150 bonus coins per key which are added to their final total.

Challenges
Fort Boyard: Ultimate Challenge uses exactly the same games like in the original show; but with different names, no lock-ins and may also be slightly adapted to suit the show. For example, in Boiler Room the contestant is not handcuffed to the pipe; instead must move a chain with the key on through the maze and out to the exit within the time limit, and The Searching Head, where the two contestants sit in a seat and there is no conveyor belt; instead, there is a plastic glass on the sides.

Each solo team challenge is against the water timer (known as a clepsdyre) usually set at either 1:30, 2:00 or 2:30 minutes. Some games (such as Tightrope and nearly all duels) require a code to open the box containing the key, which is outside the room or nearby the other team members. Games involving members of both teams are not against the water clock and are known as "duels".

Regular challenges

In order of first appearance:

Series 1:
 Caterpillar (Duel)
 Slot Machine (1:45)
 Terror Walk (Duel)
 Dark Descent (2:00)
 Key To The Sea (Duel) (time unlimited)
 Pots of Fear (1:45/1:30)
 Human Catapult/Leap Of Faith (0:30)
 Hanging Tough (Duel)
 Running Water (2:00/2:30)
 Shrinking Room (Duel) (2:00)
 Creature Count (2:00)
 Tight Rope (2:30/3:00)
 Power Pull (Duel) (time unlimited)
 Sky Bike (1:30/2:45)
 Rapid Ascent (Duel)
 Candy Roll (2:00/1:45)
 Ladder Race (Duel)
 Giant Chopsticks (2:30/2:00)
 Boiler Room (2:15/2:00)
 Giant Loom (2:00)
 Ocean Plunge (Duel, or solo in series 4) (1:45/time unlimited)
 Power Pedal (2:30/2:00)
 Spiders and Scorpions (2:30/2:00)
 Raft Race (Duel) (2:30)
 Sunken House (2:00)
 Tension Bridge (duel)
 Mission Impossible (2:15/2:30)
 Raging Sea (Duel) (alternate version of "Ocean Plunge") (time unlimited)
 Spider's Web (previously 'Human Catapult' Version 2) (2:30)

Introduced in Series 2:
 Punch Ball (2:00/1:30)
 Unstable Chair (2:00/2:15)
 Turnstile (1:30)
 Snake Pit (2:30/3:00)
 Leap of Faith Version 2 (1:30/1:00)
 Infernal Ladder (Duel) (2:00)

Introduced in Series 3:
 Pole Position (2:00)
 Trapdoor (Duel) (time unlimited)
 Poles Apart (Duel) (time unlimited)
 Face to Face (2:15/2:00)
 Rock the Boat (2:00/1:30)
 Rocket Launcher (1:45/1:30)
 Coffee Grinder (2:00)
 Swings (2:00)
 Cold Room (2:00)
 Red Alert (2:00/2:15)
 Creature Code (alternate version of 'Creature Count') (2:00)
 Underwater Dome (alternate version of 'Sunken House') (2:30)
 Monkey Ladder (Duel) (time unlimited)
 Gyroscope (1:45/1:30)
 Balancing Balls (Duel) (time unlimited)
 Pyramid (2:00/1:30)
 Underwater Net-Ball (2:30/2:00)
 Walk the Plank (2:00)
 Sea-Saw (3:00/2:00)
 Vertical Ascent (Duel) (time unlimited)
 Giant Catapults (Duel) (time unlimited)
 Round the World  (2:00)
 Submerged Cage (2:30/2:15)
 Human Bell (1:00/1:30)

Introduced in Series 4:
 Key To The Sea Ver. 2 (Duel) (time unlimited)
 Hammocks (Duel) (0:20)
 Dizzy Dash (2:00/1:45)
 Stand Tough (Duel) (time unlimited)
 Shrinking Room Ver. 2 (Duel) (time unlimited)
 Underwater Balloons (Duel) (time unlimited)
 Ring Run (2:00/2:30)
 Haunted House (2:00/1:45)
 Spin Cycle (2:00)
 Pedal Pump (Duel/1:45)
 Deadly Drop (Duel)
 Pressure Tank (2:30)
 Library (1:30)
 Balancing Brollies (2:00)

Introduced in Series 5:
 Tiger Terror (2:30/3:00)
 Blind Faith (Duel) (time unlimited)
 Ketchup Factory (2:00/2:30)
 Balance Bike (time unlimited)/(1:00)
 Tug of Four (Duel) (time unlimited)
 Garbage Grinder (2:00)
 Giant Spring (2:00)
 Ocean Climb (2:15/2:30)
 Sea Spin (1:30)
 Pressure Pull (Duel) (time unlimited)
 Equilibrium (Duel) (0:30)
 Sunken Spheres (Duel) (time unlimited)
 Flooded Prison (2:00)
 Joust (Duel)

Council duels
Before the teams go to the Treasure Chamber, the last challenge in every episode is a non-timed duel in the Council "hallway" (an open area on the second floor close to where "Cold Room" is located) between both teams. 

Tests usually involve a level of skill and speed; such as building a tower with shaped blocks, using chopsticks to write the word "Boyard" on a pole or hammering nails into a piece of wood. The whole team(s) take part in the duel and the winners receive the final key of the day. Games played so far include:

In order of first appearance:

 Surface Tension
 Tipping Point
 Tower Build
 Balance of Forces
 Letter Pick
 Hammer Time
 Reflex
 Weights
 Hang Nail
 Floating Towers
 Dominoes
 Shape Stack
 Roach Race

The Treasure Chamber
The Treasure Chamber is the climax to every episode of Fort Boyard: Ultimate Challenge. The gold is stored here, which is guarded by the fort's tigers (only in series 4 and 5).

Series 1 and 2
Before they enter the treasure chamber, every team is handed a scroll with a plan of the board (a giant alphabet chessboard), which is composed of Georgian letters and the word "Fort Boyard" is also written out on it. On this chessboard, they must place four circular plates of colour, as shown in the plan. These plates are hidden in the decorative elements of the chamber (a treasure chest, barrel or underneath ropes). They must therefore find where they are hidden. Boxes are suspended in the fountain and the key for the coins is on top of a vertical rod above and on either side of the Fountain.

Once a team has found and placed their four plates in the right place, the captain returns his/her hand to a tiger's head located nearby the entrance. If correct, the key is released to open their chest containing the coins. Once the chest is opened, coins fall into the fountain below. The team members must collect as many of these coins as possible and put them into a Plexiglas box near the entrance.

At 0:20 seconds from the end of the 3 minutes, the bell (rung by Laura Hamilton) sounds and the gate of the Treasure Chamber begins to descend, meaning that the eight candidates must get out before it closes.

Then it is time to weigh the coins; two candidates from each team take turns placing their container on the scales to set the number of points scored by the team. At the end of the show, the ranking of teams is updated compared to previous results.

Keys for the Treasure Chamber

Series 3 to 5
Several changes were made to the Treasure Chamber in this series, including a new time structure and layout. For example, the crests are not hidden and the floor plan being outside and having to memorise it.

Keys for the Treasure Chamber

Filming

Fort Boyard: Ultimate Challenge is set and filmed on the Fort Boyard fortress, on the west coast of France.

From a broadcasting perspective, Fort Boyard itself was refurbished during 1988–89 to become, essentially, a large outdoor television studio. The Fort has its own doctor, catering facilities, as well as production gallery and veterinary centre. The Fort is equipped with 10 portable television cameras, one camera crane for overhead shots, one under-water camera as well as a number of smaller cameras which specifically cover individual games and challenges around the Fort.

Filming took place between 9–15 July 2011; consisting of two seasons of 10 episodes each. A third season was filmed from 7–14 July 2012, with a further 10 episodes made. The fourth was filmed from 18–25 June 2013 and the fifth from 22–27 June 2014.

Teams
In series 1 and 2, there were 24 participants (48 in total) from 13 to 19 years of age, divided into 6 teams (12 teams in total) of 4 members with two British and two American members in each team. However, in series 3 (2012), contestants were from 13 to 18 years of age and were all British. In Series 4, they were 12-to 18-year-olds. In addition, each team has a captain.

Series 5 in 2014 saw an overhaul in team colours and animals; a new set of six team names were introduced to replace the original names: (Grey) Rhinos, (Orange) Tigers, (Lime Green) Crocodiles, (Black) Tarantulas, (Yellow Golden) Eagles and (Purple) Cobras.

In the first two series the teams consisted of three boys and a girl; from the third series, there are two boys and two girls per team.

Each team has a colour and a symbol of animal:

Series 1 to 4
Yellow Scorpions
Series 1: Louis, Shona, Jake Nathan 
Series 2: Shane, Zachary, Billy Emily 
Series 3: Tia, Joe, Charlotte Jay 
Series 4: Ruby, George, Dean Paige 

Red Vipers
Series 1: Ashley, Tashi, Jimmy  William 
Series 2: Jack, Kalium, Matt Laura   
Series 3: Lauren, Angharad, Jamie John 
Series 4: Tahlia, Jack, Suzanne Nyv 

Silver Dragons
Series 1: Charlie, Kennedy, Kyle Harry 
Series 2: Charles, Sashank, Lara James 
Series 3: Megan, Ash, Sam Sophie 
Series 4: Alex, Maddie, Jayden Maryam 

Green Jaguars
Series 1: Matt, Ryan, Xavier Amy 
Series 2: Jordan, Jackson, Joseph Imogen 
Series 3: Tom, Izzy, Mike  Celest 
Series 4: Sophie, Charlii, Elias Jordan 

Blue Sharks
Series 1: Max, Natalie, Shaun Ivan 
Series 2: Simon, Adrienne, Alex David 
Series 3: Alec, Michael, Abi Shannon 
Series 4: Tim, Katie, Rahman Josie 

White Falcons
Series 1: Kasey, Katherine, Joe Peter 
Series 2: Mitchell, Julia, Zach Callum 
Series 3: Beth, Jack, Jake Courtney 
Series 4: Jake, Ella, Josh Daisy 

Series 5
Grey Rhinos
Series 5: Sam, Katy, Josh J'nae 

Orange Tigers
Series 5: Claire, Charlie, Alex Corey 

Purple Cobras
Series 5: Finton, Olivia, Oli Scarlet 

Black Tarantulas
Series 5: Abi, Harry, Lauren Charlie 

Yellow Golden Eagles
Series 5: Ben, Chloe, Brandon Georgia

Lime Green Crocodiles
Series 5: Katy, Jack, Amelia Alex

Episodes

Series 1

Conquerors of The Fort: Yellow Scorpions

Series 2

Conquerors of The Fort: Silver Dragons

Series 3

Conquerors Of The Fort: Green Jaguars

Note: episodes 7–10 were not simulcast on both UK channels as usual; the airdates are for ITV1 only. CITV aired these at a later date, due to schedule changes and to celebrate its thirtieth anniversary.

Series 4

Conquerors Of The Fort: Green Jaguars

Series 5

Conquerors Of The Fort: Black Tarantulas

Transmissions

Disney XD (USA)

CITV (UK)
<onlyinclude>

Awards and nominations

References

External links
Comprehensive fan sites:
 
 
 

Disney XD original programming
ITV children's television shows
2010s American children's game shows
2012 British television series debuts
2014 British television series endings
British children's game shows
British television series based on non-British television series
2010s British game shows
2010s British children's television series
2011 American television series debuts
2012 American television series endings
American television series based on French television series
English-language television shows
Television shows set in France
Television series about teenagers
Television series by Banijay